Kalex Engineering is a German specialty engineering company that designs, manufactures and sells high-performance parts for motorcycles. Kalex Engineering was founded in 2008 in the Bavarian city of Bobingen, Germany by Klaus Hirsekorn and Alex Baumgärtel.

Company history
The name of Kalex was created by merging the two first names of the company founders, Klaus Hirsekorn and Alex Baumgärtel.

In 2010, with the introduction of the new 600 cc Moto2 class using controlled Honda engines, Kalex Engineering began providing its chassis to the Pons Racing team. Stefan Bradl became the first rider to achieve a world title using a Kalex chassis when he won the 2011 Moto2 World Championship for the Viessmann Kiefer Racing team.

Kalex won the Manufacturers' Championship in 2013 when teams using their chassis finished in the top four places in the Championship. In 2015, Kalex riders won all but one race, and took the top three places and nine of the top ten places in the overall standings. Riders using the Kalex chassis dominated the 2016 season, winning all 18 rounds and taking the top nine positions in the season final standings.

Following the change to Moto2 engine supply by Triumph from 2019, older Kalex chassis designs will continue to be used in the British GP2 classification, run within the British Supersport Championship from 2018.

Grand Prix Racing Results

Moto2 Constructors' Championship Results 

In 2016, 2020 and 2021, Kalex machines have won all races in the season, achieving the maximum possible points total.

Moto2 Rider's Champions

References

External links
 Kalex Engineering

German companies established in 2008
Companies based in Bavaria
Motorcycle manufacturers of Germany